The Sikorsky H-34 "Choctaw" (company designation S-58) is an American piston-engined military helicopter originally designed by Sikorsky as an anti-submarine warfare (ASW) aircraft for the United States Navy. It has seen extended use when adapted to turbine power by the British licensee as the Westland Wessex and Sikorsky as the later S-58T.

H-34s served, mostly as medium transports, on every continent with the armed forces of 25 countries. It saw combat in Algeria, the Dominican Republic, Nicaragua, and throughout Southeast Asia. Other uses included saving flood victims, recovering astronauts, fighting fires, and carrying presidents. It was the last piston-engined helicopter to be operated by the United States Marine Corps, having been replaced by turbine-powered types such as the UH-1 Huey and CH-46 Sea Knight. A total of 2,108 H-34s were manufactured between 1953 and 1970.

Development

The Sikorsky S-58 was developed as a lengthened and more powerful version of the Sikorsky Model S-55, or UH-19 Chickasaw, with a similar nose, but with a tail-dragger rear fuselage and landing gear, rather than the high-tail, 4-post pattern. It retained the nose-mounted radial reciprocating engine with the drive shaft passing through the cockpit placed high above the cargo compartment.

The aircraft first flew on 8 March 1954. The first production aircraft was ready in September and entered in service for the United States Navy initially designated HSS-1 Seabat (in its anti-submarine configuration) and HUS-1 Seahorse (in its utility transport configuration) under the U.S. Navy designation system for U.S. Navy, United States Marine Corps (USMC) and United States Coast Guard (USCG) aircraft. The U.S. Army and Marine Corps, respectively, ordered it in 1955 and 1957. Under the United States Army's aircraft designation system, also used by the United States Air Force, the helicopter was designated H-34. The U.S. Army also applied the name Choctaw to the helicopter. In 1962, under the new unified DoD aircraft designation system, the Seabat was redesignated SH-34, the Seahorse as the UH-34, and the Choctaw as the CH-34.

Roles included utility transport, anti-submarine warfare, search and rescue, and VIP transport. In its standard configuration, transport versions could carry 12 to 16 troops, or eight stretcher cases if utilized in the MedEvac role, while VIP transports carried significantly fewer people in much greater comfort.

A total of 135 H-34s were built in the US and assembled by Sud-Aviation in France, 166 were produced under licence in France by Sud-Aviation for the French Air Force, Navy and Army Aviation (ALAT).

The CH-34 was also built and developed under license from 1958 in the United Kingdom by Westland Aircraft as the turboshaft engined Wessex which was used by the Royal Navy and Royal Air Force. The RN Wessex was fitted out with weapons and ASW equipment for use in an antisubmarine role. The RAF used the Wessex, with turboshaft engines, as an air/sea rescue helicopter and as troop transporter. Wessexes were also exported to other countries and produced for civilian use.

Operational history

Algerian War

The helicopters used by the French Army Light Aviation (ALAT), including the Sikorsky H-34, aggregated over 190,000 flying hours in Algeria (over 87,000 for the H-21 alone) and helped to evacuate over 20,000 French combatants from the combat area, including nearly 2,200 at night. By the time the war in Algeria had ended, eight officers and 23 non-commissioned officers from ALAT had been killed.

The use of armed helicopters during the Algerian War, coupled with helicopter transports which can insert troops into enemy territory, gave birth to some of the tactics of airmobile warfare that continue today.

Vietnam War

French evaluations on the reported ground fire vulnerabilities of the CH-34 may have influenced the U.S. Army's decision to deploy the CH-21 Shawnee to Vietnam instead of the CH-34, pending the introduction into widespread service of the Bell UH-1 Iroquois. U.S. Army H-34s did not participate in Vietnam, and did not fly in the assault helicopter role, but a quantity were supplied to the Republic of Vietnam Air Force (RVNAF). These saw little use due to a lack of spare parts and maintenance.

Its higher availability and reliability due to its simplicity compared to the newer helicopters led Marines to ask for it by name. The phrases "give me a HUS", "get me a HUS" and "cut me a HUS" entered the U.S. Marine Corps vernacular, being used even after the type was no longer in use to mean "help me out".

USMC H-34s were also among the first helicopter gunships trialled in theatre, being fitted with the Temporary Kit-1 (TK-1), comprising two M60C machine guns and two 19-shot 2.75 inch rocket pods. The operations were met with mixed enthusiasm, and the armed H-34s, known as "Stingers" were quickly phased out. The TK-1 kit would form the basis of the TK-2 kit used on the UH-1E helicopters of the USMC.

An H-34 was featured in the famous early-Vietnam War Time-Life photo essay "One Ride With Yankee Papa 13", photographer Larry Burrows, which depicted stages of a disastrous combat mission in which several crew were wounded or killed.

Post-Vietnam War
The H-34 remained in service with United States Army and Marine Corps aviation units into the late 1960s; at this time it was also standard equipment in Marine Corps Reserve, Army Reserve and Army National Guard aviation units, eventually being replaced by the UH-1 Iroquois utility helicopter. Sikorsky terminated all production activities in 1968, a total of 1,821 having been built. All H-34 helicopters were retired from service in the U.S. military by the early 1970s; the type having the distinction of being the last piston-engined helicopter to be operated by  the Marine Corps. On 3 September 1973, the last flight of a USMC UH-34 occurred as Bureau Number 147191 which had been formally assigned to Headquarters Squadron, FMF Pacific was flown from Quantico, Virginia to MCAS New River to be placed on static display.

France
France purchased an initial batch of 134 Choctaws; these were shipped in kit-form from the United States and locally assembled by Sud-Aviation. Later, a further 166 were domestically manufactured by Sud-Aviation; these were operated by the French Army Light Aviation (Army), French Naval Aviation (Navy) and Air force.

United Kingdom

The Wessex was used as an anti-submarine and utility helicopter with the Royal Navy and as a transport and search and rescue helicopter with the Royal Air Force. British Wessex saw action in several conflicts: Falklands, Oman, Borneo, Aden, etc.

South Vietnam

Used by RVNAF 219th Squadron to insert MACV-SOG reconnaissance teams into Laos.
The H-34 was the primary RVNAF helicopter until replaced by the Bell UH-1 Huey.

Israel

Israeli S-58s flew numerous combat missions after the end of the Six-Day War; these missions were mainly against Palestinians infiltrating Israel or against their bases in Jordan. On 21 March 1968, various S-58s participated in the Battle of Karameh, bringing Israeli troops in and out of the theatre as well as evacuating the wounded. This was the last operation of the S-58 as it was retired shortly later, having been replaced by the newer Bell 205 and Aérospatiale Super Frelon.

Civilian use

The H-34's lift capacity was just sufficient to lift a Mercury space capsule. In 1961, the hatch of Mercury-Redstone 4 was prematurely detached and the capsule was filled with seawater. The extra weight was too much for the H-34 and the capsule, Liberty Bell 7, was emergency released and sank in deep water, remaining on the ocean floor until 1999.

Sikorsky set up a production line in 1970 to remanufacture existing S-58 aircraft into the S-58T configuration, replacing the R-1820 engine with a pair of Pratt & Whitney Canada PT6T-3 Twin-Pac turboshafts; Sikorsky obtained a Federal Aviation Administration type certificate for the conversion in April 1971. The type certificate for the S-58T was sold to California Helicopter International in 1981.

In the late 1980s and early 1990s, S-58T helicopters were operated by New York Helicopters in scheduled passenger airline service between JFK International Airport and East 34th Street Heliport, New York.

In the early 1970s, Orlando Helicopter Airways developed a novel civil conversion of the S-55/H-19, the Heli-Camper, a campervan-like conversion—featuring a built-in mini-kitchen and sleeping accommodations for four. Later in that decade, Orlando developed a larger version based on the S-58, and participated in a joint effort with popular American recreational vehicle (RV) manufacturer Winnebago Industries to market both aircraft as the Winnebago Heli-Home. The S-58 version featured a larger kitchenette, sleeping accommodations for six, a minibar, and an entertainment system; optional floats were offered for amphibious operations. The aircraft were featured in several American popular magazines and reportedly drew large crowds at RV shows and dealerships, but their high purchase price together with rising 1970s fuel prices resulted in very limited sales; production is not well documented, but is estimated at only six or seven of the S-55 and S-58 versions combined.

Variants
H-34A
U.S. Army version of the HSS-1 powered by a 1,525 hp R-1820-84, re-designated CH-34A in 1962, 359 built and 21 transferred from the U.S. Navy.
JH-34A
Designation for H-34A used for weapon tests.
VH-34A
Staff transport conversions of H-34A.
H-34B
H-34As converted with detail changes, became CH-34B in 1962.
H-34C
H-34B design with detail changes converted from H-34As, became CH-34C in 1962.
JH-34C
Designation for CH-34C used for weapon tests.
VH-34C
Staff transport conversions of CH-34C.
HH-34D
Designation applied to aircraft given USAF serials to be transferred under MAP and MDAP.
LH-34D
HUS-1L re-designated in 1962
UH-34D
HUS-1 re-designated in 1962 and 54 new build.
VH-34D
HUS-1Z re-designated in 1962
UH-34E
HUS-1A re-designated in 1962
HH-34F
HUS-1G re-designated in 1962
YSH-34G
YHSS-1 re-designated in 1962
SH-34G
HSS-1 re-designated in 1962
SH-34H
HSS-1F re-designated in 1962
YSH-34J

YHSS-1N re-designated in 1962
SH-34J
HSS-1N re-designated in 1962
UH-34J
SH-34J without ASW equipment for cargo and training purposes.
HH-34J
Ex-USN UH-34Js operated by the U.S. Air Force
VH-34J
Staff transport conversions of SH-34J.
XHSS-1 Seabat
Three Sikorsky S-58s for evaluation by the U.S. Navy, re-designated YHSS-1 then YSH-34G in 1962.
HSS-1 Seabat
Production Anti-Submarine model for the U.S. Navy, re-designated SH-34G in 1962, 215 built
HSS-1F Seabat
One HSS-1 re-engined with two YT-58-GE as a flying test bed, re-designated SH-34H in 1962.
YHSS-1N Seabat
One HSS-1 converted as the HSS-1N prototype, re-designated YSH-34J in 1962.
HSS-1N Seabat
Night/Bad weather version of the HSS-1 with improved avionics and autopilot, re-designated SH-34J in 1962, 167 built (an addition 75 HSS-1 airframes were built to CH-34C standard for West Germany).
HUS-1 Seahorse
Utility transport version of the HSS-1 for the U.S. Marine Corps, re-designated UH-34D in 1962, 462 built
HUS-1A Seahorse
Forty HUS-1s fitted with amphibious pontoons, re-designated UH-34E in 1962.
HUS-1G Seahorse
United States Coast Guard version of the HUS-1, re-designated HH-34F in 1962, six built.
HUS-1L Seahorse
Four HUS-1s converted for Antarctic operations with VXE-6, re-designated LH-34D in 1962.
HUS-1Z Seahorse
Seven HUS-1s fitted with VIP interior for the Executive Flight Detachment, re-designated VH-34D in 1962.
CH-126
Canadian military designation for the S-58B.
S-58A
Commercial designation for basic cargo variant, certified in 1956
S-58B
Commercial designation for improved cargo variant, certified in 1956
S-58C
Commercial passenger transport/airliner version, certified in 1956

S-58D
Commercial airliner/freighter version, certified in 1961
S-58E
Certified in 1971
S-58F
Certified in 1972 an increased maximum weight variant of the S-58B.
S-58G
Certified in 1972 an increased maximum weight variant of the S-58C.
S-58H
Certified in 1972 an increased maximum weight variant of the S-58D.
S-58J
Certified in 1972 an increased maximum weight variant of the S-58E
S-58T
Commercial conversion to turboshaft power using Pratt & Whitney Canada PT6T-3 Twin-Pac turboshaft with special nose cowling featuring distinctive twin rectangular air intakes, designations relate to original model:
S-58BT
Turboshaft-powered conversion of the S-58B
S-58DT
Turboshaft-powered conversion of the S-58D
S-58ET
Turboshaft-powered conversion of the S-58E
S-58FT
Turboshaft-powered conversion of the S-58F
S-58HT
Turboshaft-powered conversion of the S-58H
S-58JT
Turboshaft-powered conversion of the S-58J
Orlando Heli-Camper / Winnebago Heli-Home
RV conversion by Winnebago Industries and Orlando Helicopter, fitted with a Wright Cyclone R-1820-24 engine
Orlando Airliner
Commercial conversion. 18-seat passenger transport helicopter.
Westland Wessex 
 Licence production and development in the United Kingdom.

Operators
  
Argentine Air Force 
Argentine Naval Aviation
  
Belgian Air Force
Belgian Navy
  
Brazilian Navy
  
Royal Canadian Air Force
Canadian Armed Forces
  
Chilean Navy
  
Ministry of Public Security
  
French Army
French Navy 
  
German Air Force
German Army
German Navy
  
Haitian Air Corps
  
Indonesian Air Force
  
Italian Air Force 
  
Israeli Air Force
  
Japan Maritime Self-Defense Force
 
Khmer Air Force
  Kingdom of Laos
Royal Lao Air Force
  
Royal Netherlands Navy
  
Fuerza Aérea Sandinista
  
 Philippine Air Force
 
Republic of Vietnam Air Force 
  
Republic of China Army
  
Royal Thai Air Force
  
 Air America
United States Air Force
United States Army
United States Marine Corps
United States Navy
United States Coast Guard
  
Uruguayan Navy

Accidents and incidents
27 July 1960 Chicago Helicopter Airways Flight 698 a S-58C registered N879 crashed into Forest Home Cemetery, Forest Park, Illinois, United States with the loss of 11 passengers and two crew. The investigation concluded that the helicopter became uncontrollable as a result of structural disintegration in flight caused by a fatigue failure of the main rotor blade.
14 November 1971 Sikorsky SH-34J, A-062 of the Uruguayan Navy lost control after trying to lift a ground vehicle in an airshow, the helicopter fell to the ground hitting another Sikorsky SH-34J Helicopter. The broken blades flew directly into the audience of the airshow killing 8 people and severely injuring and mutilating at least 40 more. Due to the unstable political situation of the country at the time, no investigation followed the accident. Several years later, many irregularities came to light: The helicopter condition was not good when it was purchased by the Uruguayan Navy, fuel used was not appropriate, temperature on the day of the accident was too high to attempt a heavy lift, and the co-pilot of the helicopter was a fixed wing pilot with no experience in rotary wing aircraft.
10 July 2002 Sikorsky S-58ET, N580US (S/N 58-1673, built 1963), struck power transmission lines with its tailwheel, ripping the aircraft in two, over Brookville Lake, Indiana. One crew member was killed; the other two crew members were rescued by boaters. The aircraft was operated by Midwest Helicopter Airways of Hinsdale, Illinois, and registered to Midwest Truxton International of Burr Ridge, Illinois. "Based on interviews with witnesses and the surviving pilots, there was no indication of any mechanical failure," said SGT. Steve Comer of the Indiana State Police. NTSB Accident Report #CHI02FA189 
13 March 2011 Sikorsky S-58ET, N33602, suffered an engine failure, descended and veered off the side of an office building in El Segundo, California, while lifting an external air conditioning unit from the roof. The commercial pilot was seriously injured, the helicopter was substantially damaged and consumed by a post-impact fire. The helicopter was registered to Heli Flight, Inc., and operated by Aris Helicopters.

Aircraft on display

Canada
 130761 - H34C in storage at the Reynolds-Alberta Museum in Wetaskiwn, Alberta.

Chile
 Naval 52 – SH-34J on static display at Viña del Mar Airport in Viña del Mar, Valparaíso. This airframe was the second of two received by the Chilean Navy and was exhibited for the first time after restoration at Exponaval 2014. It was previously on display at Alberto Widmer High School.

France
 HSS-1, No. 182, is on display at the Base d'aéronautique navale d'Hyères, the military part of the Toulon–Hyères Airport in France. Serving until 1977 with 31F squadron, it was one of the last operational H-34's in French Naval Aviation. Now restored, No. 182 is displayed in the typical navy blue color of the French navy's helicopters of this time period.

Germany
 80+73 – SH-34G on static display at the Deutsches Museum in Munich, Bavaria.
 81+09 – H-34 GIII on static display at the Hubschraubermuseum Bückeburg in Bückeburg, Lower Saxony.
 58-0356 – S-58C on static display at the Auto & Technik Museum Sinsheim in Sinsheim, Baden-Württemberg.
Indonesia

 H-3402 - UH-34 on static display at Dirgantara Mandala Museum in Yogyakarta.
 H-3404 - S-58T on static display outside Dirgantara Mandala Museum in Yogyakarta.
 H-3415 - S-58T on static display in front of Atang Senjaya airbase in Bogor.
Netherlands
 A former Royal Netherlands Navy SH-34J Seabat bearing the markings of number 134 operating from Valkenburg naval air station is on display with folded rotor blades and tail in the newly opened "Nationaal Militair Museum" situated at the former airbase of Soesterberg. Previously the aircraft was displayed in the National Air Force museum at Kamp Zeist which has since closed down.

Thailand
 H4k-64/30 – Type 4A on static display at the Royal Thai Air Force Museum in Bangkok, Bangkok.
 Unknown ID – Type 4 on static display at the Royal Thai Air Force Museum in Bangkok, Bangkok.

Philippines
  153131 – UH-34D on static display at the Philippine Air Force Aerospace Museum in Villamor Air Base, Pasay.

United States

 138460 – UH-34D on static display at the Evergreen Aviation & Space Museum in McMinnville, Oregon.
 143937 – UH-34D on static display at the Estrella Warbirds Museum in Paso Robles, California.
 143939 – H-34A on static display at the USS Midway Museum in San Diego, California.
 145694 – UH-34J on static display at the Wings of Freedom Aviation Museum in Horsham, Pennsylvania. This airframe was built in October 1958 and restored in April 1995.
 145717 – LH-34D on static display at the New England Air Museum in Windsor Locks, Connecticut.
 147191 – VH-34D is on static display at the New River Aviation Memorial at the front gate of Marine Corps Air Station New River in Jacksonville, North Carolina. This airframe was the last flying US Marine Corps H-34 in 1973.
 148002 – SH-34J on static display at the Pueblo Weisbrod Aircraft Museum in Pueblo, Colorado.
 148764 – UH-34D on static display at Fort Worth NAS near Fort Worth, Texas.
 148768 – UH-34D on static display at the Udvar-Hazy Center of the National Air and Space Museum in Chantilly, Virginia.
 148963 – HH-34J on static display at the Pacific Aviation Museum in Honolulu, Hawaii.
 150213 – UH-34D on static display at the Cavanaugh Flight Museum in Addison, Texas.
 150219 – UH-34D on static display at the Flying Leatherneck Aviation Museum in San Diego, California.
 150227 – UH-34D on static display at the National Museum of Naval Aviation in Pensacola, Florida.
 150255 – UH-34D on static display at the Wings and Rotors Air Museum in Murrieta, California.
 150553 – UH-34D on static display at the USS Hornet Museum in Alameda, California. This airframe entered service in August 1963 and was donated to the museum in 2003 by the Pima Air and Space Museum.
 150570 – UH-34D on static display at the National Museum of the Marine Corps in Triangle, Virginia.
 154895 – UH-34D on static display at the Palm Springs Air Museum in Palm Springs, California.
 53-4477 – CH-34G on static display at the Air Force Flight Test Center Museum in Edwards, California.
 53-4526 – CH-34A in storage at the United States Army Aviation Museum near Daleville, Alabama.
 53-4544 – CH-34C on static display at the Camp San Luis Obispo Museum and Historical Site in San Luis Obispo, California.
 54-0914 – CH-34C on static display at the Russell Military Museum in Zion, Illinois.
 55-4496 – CH-34C in storage at the Carolinas Aviation Museum in Charlotte, North Carolina. This airframe was previously on display at the Florence Air & Missile Museum in Florence, South Carolina.
 56-4320 – VH-34C on static display at the United States Army Aviation Museum near Daleville, Alabama.
 57-1684 – VH-34C on static display at the Pima Air and Space Museum in Tucson, Arizona.
 57-1698 – CH-34A on static display at the Allegheny Arms & Armor Museum in Smethport, Pennsylvania. This airframe was previously on display at the Intrepid Sea, Air & Space Museum in New York, New York.
 57-1705 – CH-34C on static display at Travis AFB near Fairfield, California.
 57-1708 – CH-34C on static display at the Pacific Coast Air Museum in Santa Rosa, California.
 57-1725 – VH-34C on static display at the U.S. Army Transportation Museum near Newport News, Virginia.

Specifications (H-34 Choctaw)

Notable appearances in media

See also

Notes

Bibliography
 Apostolo, Giorgio. The Illustrated Encyclopedia of Helicopters. New York: Bonanza Books, 1984. .
 Duke, R.A. Helicopter Operations in Algeria [Translated French]. Washington, DC:  Dept. of the Army, 1959.
 
 Fails, William R. Marines & Helicopters, 1962–1973. Darby, Pennsylvania: Diane Publishing, 1995. .
 Griffin, John A. Canadian Military Aircraft Serials & Photographs 1920–1968. Ottawa, Ontario, Canada: Queen's Printer, Publication No. 69-2, 1969.
 Gunston, Bill. An Illustrated Guide To the Israeli Air Force. London: Salamander Books, 1982. .
 Leuliette, Pierre. St. Michael and the Dragon: Memoirs of a Paratrooper, New York: Houghton Mifflin, 1964.
 Mesko, Jim: Airmobile: The Helicopter War in Vietnam. Carollton, Texas: Squadron/Signal Publications, 1984. .
 Riley, David. "French Helicopter Operations in Algeria." Marine Corps Gazette, February 1958, pp. 21–26.
 Shrader, Charles R. The First Helicopter War: Logistics and Mobility in Algeria, 1954–1962. Westport, Connecticut: Praeger Publishers, 1999. .
 Spenser, Jay P. Whirlybirds: A History of the U.S. Helicopter Pioneers. Seattle, Washington: University of Washington Press, 1998. .

Further reading
 Padin, Núñez, Jorge Felix and Juan Carlos Cicalesi, eds. Sikorsky S-55/H-19 & S-58/T (Serie en Argentina) in Spanish. Bahía Blanca, Argentina: Fuerzas Aeronavales, 2011. .

External links

 VNAF Kingbee 219th Squadron history fact sheet 
 HELIS.com Sikorsky S-58/H-34/HSS-1/HUS-1 Database

H-034
H-34, Sikorsky
United States military helicopters
1950s United States helicopters
Single-engined piston helicopters
Twin-turbine helicopters
Aircraft first flown in 1954